, is a Japanese idol girl group that formed in October 2018. They released their debut single, "Megane no Otoko no Ko / Nippon no D・N・A! / Go Waist", on August 7, 2019.

History

2018: Formation 
On October 19, 2018, Beyooooonds was formed. The group is formed of three units, "Chica#Tetsu" led by Reina Ichioka, "" led by Kurumi Takase and "SeasoningS" led by Miyo Hirai.

2019–2020: Beyooooond1st 
On April 30, 2019, the group's major debut was announced for August 7, 2019. They released their debut triple A-side single, ", on August 7, as previously announced. They released their first album, Beyooooond1st, on November 27. The group's first solo tour was held from December 2–17, 2019, with three performances in three cities. On December 30, the group won the "Best New Artist" award at the 61st Japan Record Awards.

2021–present: Beyooooo2nds 
Their second single, was released on March 3, 2021. On March 2, 2022, they released their third single, .

Members
Reina Ichioka (一岡伶奈) - leader
Kurumi Takase (高瀬くるみ) - leader
Miyo Hirai (平井美葉) - leader
Honoka Kobayashi (小林萌花)
Rika Shimakura (島倉りか)
Utano Satoyoshi (里吉うたの)
Kokoro Maeda (前田こころ)
Yuhane Yamazaki (山﨑夢羽)
Shiori Nishida (西田汐里)
Saya Eguchi (江口紗耶)
Minami Okamura (岡村美波)
Momohime Kiyono (清野桃々姫)

Timeline
Red (vertical) = Major singles
Green (vertical) = Studio albums

Discography

Studio albums

Singles

Awards and nominations

References

External links
Official website

Japanese girl groups
Japanese idol groups
Japanese pop music groups
Musical groups from Tokyo
2018 establishments in Japan
Musical groups established in 2018